Sabido is a surname. Notable people with the surname include:

Andrés Sabido (born 1957), Spanish footballer
Dolores Rodríguez Sabido (born 1958), Mexican politician
Hugo Sabido (born 1979), Portuguese cyclist
Irene Sabido, Mexican producer and writer
Luis Pérez Sabido (born 1940), Mexican poet, composer, theatrical author and cultural promoter
Miguel Sabido (born 1937), Mexican producer, writer, researcher and theorist
Pedro Sabido (1894–1980), Filippino politician